József Zsók (born 2 October 1984) is a Hungarian football player who currently plays for Paksi SE.

References
Player profile at HLSZ 

1984 births
Living people
People from Szekszárd
Hungarian footballers
Association football defenders
Szekszárdi UFC footballers
Dunaújváros FC players
Győri ETO FC players
Lombard-Pápa TFC footballers
Bajai LSE footballers
Kaposvári Rákóczi FC players
Paksi FC players
Sportspeople from Tolna County